Katherine Joan Bedingfield (born October 29, 1981) is an American political advisor who is the White House Communications Director in the Biden administration. She served as deputy campaign manager for the Joe Biden 2020 presidential campaign and former communications director for Biden when he was Vice President in the Obama administration.

Early life and education

Kate Bedingfield was born on October 29, 1981, and raised in Sandy Springs, Georgia. Her parents are Dana H. and Sid E. Bedingfield. She attended Sandy Springs Middle School and graduated from Riverwood High School. She earned her bachelor's degree from the University of Virginia.

Career

Career in politics

Bedingfield worked on the John Edwards 2008 presidential campaign as spokesperson. She also served as communications director for the 2008 senate campaign for Jeanne Shaheen. In 2015, Bedingfield was named communications director for then Vice President Joe Biden. She also held two additional roles in the Obama administration: director of response, and deputy director of media affairs.

Bedingfield served as deputy campaign manager for the Joe Biden 2020 presidential campaign. Her work on the campaign led to Fortune naming Bedingfield one of the most influential people under the age of 40 in government and politics.

Biden administration

In November 2020, Bedingfield was designated White House Communications Director for the Biden administration. In late July 2022, Bedingfield reversed the decision announced weeks earlier to leave her position as White House Communications Director.

In February 2023, Bedingfield announced that she would leave the administration at the end of the month. Her position will be filled by Ben LaBolt.

Private sector

In November 2011, Bedingfield started working at the Motion Picture Association of America (MPAA). In May 2013, Bedingfield was named spokesperson and vice president of corporate communications at the MPAA. After working in the Obama administration, Bedingfield returned briefly to sports and entertainment communications.

Personal life

Bedingfield married David Kelley Kieve on January 12, 2013, at St. John's Episcopal Church, Lafayette Square in Washington, D.C. Bedingfield and Kieve have two children together. Kieve currently serves as the President of the Environmental Defense Action Fund.

References

External links
Kate Bedingfield's profile from the Biden-Harris transition website

Bill Barrow (March 26, 2020)  "Meet the masterminds behind Biden's surge: women operatives" from the Christian Science Monitor

1981 births
21st-century American businesswomen
21st-century American businesspeople
American campaign managers
American telecommunications industry businesspeople
Biden administration personnel
Living people
Motion Picture Association people
Obama administration personnel
People from Sandy Springs, Georgia
University of Virginia alumni
Washington, D.C., Democrats